The Mim Museum is a private museum in Beirut, Lebanon. 
The museum displays more than 2000 minerals, representing 450 different species from 70 countries, and is considered one of the most significant private collections of minerals in the world. It opened in 2013.

The museum also hosts an exhibition of marine and flying fossils from Lebanon.

History 
The MIM mineral collection was put together from 1997 by Salim Eddé, chemical engineer and co-founder of the computer company Murex4. In 2004, he decided to make his collection accessible to the public and designed the first museum of its kind in Lebanon. Eddé presented the idea to Father René Chamussy, rector of the Saint Joseph University, who adopted it and reserved for the collection 1,300 m2 in the basement of a building then under construction on the campus near the National Museum of Beirut.

During the next ten years, Eddé continued to build up his collection, assisted by Jean-Claude Boulliard, curator of the Sorbonne collection. The inauguration of the museum, built on the personal funds of the collector, finally took place in October 2013.

See also
 List of museums in Lebanon
 Paleontological sites of Lebanon
 Eupodophis

References

External links
 Mim Museum Facebook page

Museums in Beirut
Mineralogy museums